The Federal Police is the national and principal law enforcement agency of Austria. The Federal Police was formed in July 2005 as one formal unit of police. In 2005, the Federal Police replaced the Austrian Federal Gendarmerie, which policed most of the country, and the Polizei which policed Austria’s major urban centres such as Vienna, Salzburg and Graz. The Federal Police also serves as Austria’s border control agency. The Federal Police works in partnership with the 19 municipal police agencies and other law enforcement agencies in Austria.

Command structure
The Federal Police is commanded by the Austrian Federal Ministry of the Interior. The Federal Minister of the Interior is the highest law enforcement authority. The Provincial Police Directorates - established as federal authorities in the provinces - are subordinate to the Federal Minister. District administrative authorities (i.e. authorities established in the provinces for indirect federal administration) are subordinate to the Provincial Police Directorates. There are nine separate provincial police directorates which correspond to the nine provinces of Austria. They are as follows:
 Vienna
 Styria
 Carinthia
 Salzburg
 Lower Austria
 Upper Austria
 Vorarlberg
 Tyrol
 Burgenland

Dependent on the division, the districts and cities are controlled by either a District Police Command or a City Police Command. These commands then operate through several police stations throughout the state.

Equipment
The standard issue sidearm of the Austrian Federal Police officers is the Glock pistol in 9mm Parabellum. The most common model used are Glock 17 and Glock 19 both being the Gen 3 models while EKO Cobra also gain the Glock 18 with full-auto capability for more firepower. Officers are also equipped with batons and pepper spray for use as a less lethal option. Officers may also use Steyr AUG assault rifle, the Heckler & Koch MP5 and other similar heavy duty weapons required for specialist operations.

Vehicles

Ground vehicles

The ground vehicles currently used by the Federal Police include:
 Volkswagen Sharan
 Volkswagen Touran
 Volkswagen Passat 
 Audi A6
 Volkswagen Golf estate
 Volkswagen Multivan
 Škoda Kodiaq
 Volkswagen Amarok 
 Volkswagen Touareg 
 Mercedes-Benz Sprinter 
 Mercedes-Benz B180 
 Mercedes-Benz C-Class 
 Mercedes-Benz G-Class
 Ford Transit
 Škoda Octavia
 Nissan Pathfinder
 Mercedes-Benz O303
 BMW R 1200 RT 
 Ducati Multistrada 
 Sonderwagen 4

The Federal Police experimented with a Porsche 911 in order to crack down on motorway speeding. After a six-month test phase, the Federal Police decided not to order more 911s due to fact that there was not sufficient storage space for their equipment and the high-cost of the vehicles.

Aircraft

Aircraft currently used by the Federal Police include:
 7 Eurocopter EC135
 1 Bell 206
 4 Ecureuil AS 350 B1
 2 Ecureuil AS 355 F2
 2 Ecureuil AS 355 N

Ranks and rank insignia
Commissioners

Leading officers

Supervising officers and police officers

Historical ranks

See also
 EKO Cobra

References

External links 
 Official Austrian Police Website

Federal law enforcement agencies of Austria